Blues at Sunset is a blues album by Albert King, recorded live at Wattstax (August 20, 1972) and at the Montreux Jazz Festival (July 1, 1973), and released in 1993. Material recorded at the 1973 Montreux festival had previously been released in his albums Montreux Festival and Blues At Sunrise.

Track listing
"Match Box Blues"  (Albert King) – 4:41
"Got To Be Some Changes Made"  (Albert King, Conrad) – 5:31
"I'll Play the Blues For You" (Jerry Beach) – 5:40
"Killing Floor" (Chester Burnett) – 3:37
"Angel of Mercy"  (Homer Banks, Raymond Jackson) – 5:02
"Match Box Blues"  (Albert King) – 5:22
"Watermelon Man" (Herbie Hancock) – 2:35
"Breaking Up Somebody's Home"  (Al Jackson Jr., Timothy Matthews) – 5:02
"Stormy Monday"  (Aaron "T-Bone" Walker) – 11:51

At Wattstax: #1-5.
At Montreux: #6-9.

Personnel (Wattstax)
 Albert King - Electric guitar and vocals
 other personnel unknown

Wattstax recording by Wally Heider Studios.

Personnel (Montreux)
 Albert King - Electric guitar and vocals
 Donald Kinsey - Electric guitar
 Rick Watson - Tenor Saxophone
 Norville Hodges - Trumpet
 Wilbur Thompson - Trumpet
 James Washington - Organ
 Bill Rennie - Bass
 Sam King - drums

Montreux recording by SR (Radio Suisse) staff.

Digital Remastering : 1993, Phil de Lancie (Phantasy Studios, Berkeley).

References

Albert King albums
1973 live albums
Stax Records live albums
Albums recorded at the Montreux Jazz Festival
Live blues albums